Milkwater is a 2020 American LGBTQ comedy drama independent film written and directed by Morgan Ingari, in her feature film debut. It stars Molly Bernard, Ava Eisenson, Patrick Breen, Bryn Carter, Bianca Castro and Robin de Jesús. The film had its world premiere at the Brooklyn Film Festival in June 2020, and had additional screenings at the Provincetown International Film Festival, Atlanta Film Festival and the Nashville Film Festival. The movie was released to streaming services on May 21, 2021. The film takes its title from the poem The Consecrating Mother by poet Anne Sexton. Ingari said she created the film with a team of entirely female department heads. Molly Bernard who stars in the film, also served as an executive producer. The movie was filmed on location in Brooklyn.

Plot

Milo is in her twenties and feels like her life is lacking in purpose after attending her friend Noor's baby shower. Her roommate George leaves to go on a date, and since she is feeling miserable, she leaves and goes to the local bar. She starts up a conversation with a patron at the bar, Roger, an older gay man. The two start talking about children, and Roger tells her that he's always wanted a family, but his attempts at adoption and surrogacy have failed. Milo and Roger stay in touch with one another and start to develop a friendship. She starts hanging out with Roger at the drag bar he owns, and they become drinking buddies. Milo senses Roger's despair at not having children, and she decides to become his surrogate. However, when their relationship starts to awkwardly move forward and Milo grows attached to Roger, he feels like Milo might want something more, so he distances himself from her. She's also managed to piss off her friend Noor, and her roommate George and his boyfriend. Milo must now contend with relationship boundaries, process the emotions she is having, and the pressure of the decision she made. In the end, Roger wants to parent the child alone, which takes Milo some time to come to terms with, but eventually she does.

Cast
 Molly Bernard as Milo
 Patrick Breen as Roger
 Robin de Jesús as George
 Ava Eisenson as Noor
 Ade Otukoya as Cameron
 Jess Stark as KJ
 Michael Judson Berry as Teddy
 Alexander Hodge as Kaz
 Sean Rogers as Tom
 Nicholas Hiattas as Felix 
 Bianca Castro as Gigi Sordide
 Khalid Rivera as Jesus
 Justin Crowley as Ken
 Bryn Carter as Dr. Pierre
 Kea Trevett as Ashton
 Rachel Joravsky as Peyton
 Giana DeGeiso as Trivia Host
 Jamie Rosler as Trivia Host
 Brita Filter as Drag Queen #1
 Elliott Halperin as Clarice DuBoius /Drag Queen #2
 Tyler Joseph as Frank Antonio
 Finnley Wan as Eddie/Oler Lena

Critical reception
Lorry Kikta at Film Threat rated the movie 7/10, and said the film is "quite funny and very well written and directed by Morgan Ignari [sic], and Molly Bernard is perfect in the role of Milo". David Rooney wrote in his review for The Hollywood Reporter that it is a "modest film that acquires pleasing depth as it progresses". He also noted that Ingari and Molly Bernard show a "warm understanding of a central character whose questionable choice sends her stumbling forward toward a new maturity...and an expertly gauged closing scene with just the right hint of sentiment maximizes the movie's strengths". Gary Kramer of Gay City News said Bernard plays Milo with the "right mix of spunk and insecurity"...and while Ingari's film may not "give its other queer characters enough development, they serve their purpose as foils for Milo". Overall, he said patience may be required for the film, but it is "ultimately worthwhile".

The Advocate wrote in their blurb that Ingari "explores the complexities of sexuality, parenthood, and emotional attachment with beautiful, and sometimes brutal honesty". They also called out Molly Bernard for her "brilliant" performance as Milo". Joey Moser wrote for Awards Daily that "Ingari balances a surprisingly emotional tale with sharp humor in...a winning comedy with a fantastic lead performance from Molly Bernard". Aidan Croft of SLUG Magazine said the film has "solid performances, with some tender scenes from Bernard and Breen in particular...it's well-paced, produced and feels comfortable to watch".

See also
List of LGBT-related films of 2020

References

External links

Milkwater at Rotten Tomatoes

2020 films
2020 independent films
2020 LGBT-related films
American LGBT-related films
American independent films
Films set in Brooklyn
Gay-related films
LGBT-related comedy-drama films
2020s English-language films
2020s American films